Eleonora Bentivoglio (d. after 1505) was an Italian ruler.  She was regent of Sassuolo between 1501 and 1505 during the minority of her son Alessandro Pio di Savoia.

References 

15th-century births
16th-century  deaths
16th-century women rulers
15th-century Italian women
16th-century Italian nobility
People from Sassuolo